The 2018 Canada Open (officially known as the Yonex Canada Open 2018 for sponsorship reasons) was a badminton tournament that took place at Canadian Winter Sport Institute in Canada from 19 to 24 June 2018 and had a total purse of $75,000.

Tournament
The 2018 Canada Open was the third Super 100 tournament of the 2018 BWF World Tour and also part of the Canada Open championships which has been held since 1957. This tournament was organized by the Badminton Canada with the sanction of the BWF.

Venue
This international tournament was held at Markin-MacPhail Centre in Calgary, Alberta, Canada.

Point distribution
Below is the point distribution for each phase of the tournament based on the BWF points system for the BWF Tour Super 100 event.

Prize money
The total prize money for this tournament was US$75,000. Distribution of prize money was in accordance with BWF regulations.

Men's singles

Seeds

 Sameer Verma (withdrew)
 Mark Caljouw (third round)
 Ygor Coelho de Oliveira (second round)
 Huang Yuxiang (second round)
 Lee Dong-keun (second round)
 Yu Igarashi (second round)
 Nguyễn Tiến Minh (third round)
 Toby Penty (quarter-finals)

Finals

Top half

Section 1

Section 2

Bottom half

Section 3

Section 4

Women's singles

Seeds

 Michelle Li (second round)
 Sayaka Takahashi (final)
 Kim Hyo-min (first round)
 Minatsu Mitani (first round)
 Gao Fangjie (quarter-finals)
 Natalia Koch Rohde (withdrew)
 Rachel Honderich (quarter-finals)
 Brittney Tam (second round)

Finals

Top half

Section 1

Section 2

Bottom half

Section 3

Section 4

Men's doubles

Seeds

 Marcus Ellis / Chris Langridge (champions)
 Mark Lamsfuß / Marvin Emil Seidel (final)
 Josche Zurwonne / Jones Ralfy Jansen (first round)
 Jelle Maas / Robin Tabeling (second round)
 Nipitphon Phuangphuapet / Nanthakarn Yordphaisong (second round) 
 Han Chengkai / Zhou Haodong (quarter-finals) 
 Peter Briggs / Tom Wolfenden (second round) 
 Jason Ho-shue / Nyl Yakura (quarter-finals)

Finals

Top half

Section 1

Section 2

Bottom half

Section 3

Section 4

Women's doubles

Seeds

 Ayako Sakuramoto / Yukiko Takahata (champions)
 Selena Piek / Cheryl Seinen (second round)
 Émilie Lefel / Anne Tran (semi-finals)
 Misato Aratama / Akane Watanabe (second round)

Finals

Top half

Section 1

Section 2

Bottom half

Section 3

Section 4

Mixed doubles

Seeds

 Marcus Ellis / Lauren Smith (champions)
 Mark Lamsfuß / Isabel Herttrich (final)
 Jacco Arends / Selena Piek (semi-finals)
 Marvin Emil Seidel / Linda Efler (semi-finals)
 Lu Kai / Chen Lu (quarter-finals)
 Ben Lane / Jessica Pugh (second round)
 Robin Tabeling / Cheryl Seinen (quarter-finals)
 Đỗ Tuấn Đức / Phạm Như Thảo (first round)

Finals

Top half

Section 1

Section 2

Bottom half

Section 3

Section 4

References

External links
 Tournament Link

Canadian Open (badminton)
Canada Open
Canada Open
Sport in Calgary
June 2018 sports events in Canada